B.G. James may refer to:

Brian Girard James (born 1969), aka B. G. James, wrestler